Love and Hate is a 2014 studio album by American singer-songwriter Joan Osborne. The concept album represents Osborne's first attempt at a song cycle, exploring the relationship between love and hate. The release took her years to finalize and has received positive reviews from critics.

Reception
The editorial staff at AllMusic Guide gave this album 3.5 out of five stars, with reviewer Thom Jurek noting Osborne's experimentation as a songwriter, creating a song cycle in the album and noting the diversity of musical genres, but criticizing that "some of these songs falter". Kelly McCartney of PopMatters scored this release a seven out of 10, noting that these songs show Osborne's maturity as a signer and songwriter, summing up that Love and Hate is "particularly satisfying in that it delivers on—and extends—the promise made by her wonderful debut so many years ago".

Track listing
"Where We Start" (Joan Osborne and Jack Petruzzelli) – 5:43
"Work On Me" (Osborne and Petruzzelli) – 2:45
"Mongrels" (Osborne and Petruzzelli) – 4:10
"Train" (Osborne and Petruzzelli) – 4:36
"Up All Night" (Eric Bazilian and Osborne) – 3:50
"Not Too Well Acquainted" (Osborne and Petruzzelli) – 5:46
"Thirsty for My Tears" (Keith Cotton and Osborne) – 3:37
"Love And Hate" (Cotton and Osborne) – 3:38
"Kitten’s Got Claws" (Osborne and Petruzzelli) – 5:20
"Secret Room" (Osborne and Petruzzelli) – 4:05
"Keep It Underground" (Gary Lucas, Osborne, and Petruzzelli) – 3:44
"Raga" (Cotton, Dorianne Luax, and Osborne) – 2:21

Personnel
Note: liner notes to this album have extensive thank yous to several musicians, but they do not clarify who performed on the album or what role they performed other than the technical personnel below
Joan Osborne – vocals, production, art direction
Eric Bazilian – recording at Red Door Recordings, Philadelphia, Pennsylvania, United States
Keith Cotton – recording at Window Sill Productions, New York City, New York, United States
Jeff Fasano – photography
Paul Grosso – creative direction and design
Fred Kevorkian – mastering at Avatar Studios, New York City, New York, United States
Pete Klepper – recording at Lake House Recording Studios, Albrightsville, Pennsylvania, United States
Roman Klun – recording at His House Studios/Innsbruck Studios, New York City, New York, United States
Rich Lamb – recording and mixing on "Where We Start", "Not Too Well Acquainted", and "Secret Room" at Lake House Recording Studios, Albrightsville, Pennsylvania, United States; string recording sessions at Systems Two, New York City, New York, United States
Jack Petruzzelli – production
Mark Plati – mixing on all tracks, except where noted at Alice's Restaurant, New York City, New York, United States
Gia Rose – art direction

References

External links

2014 albums
Joan Osborne albums
MNRK Music Group albums
Albums produced by Jack Petruzzelli